Lostock may refer to:

Places 
Lostock, Bolton, a residential district of Bolton in Greater Manchester, England
Lostock Hall Gatehouse
Lostock railway station
Lostock, New South Wales, in Dungog Shire, Australia
Lostock, Trafford, a residential district of Trafford in Greater Manchester, England
Lostock High School, previously called Lostock College
Lostock Dam, a dam on the Paterson River in New South Wales, Australia
Lostock Hall, a small village to the south of Preston in Lancashire, England
Lostock Hall railway station
River Lostock, a river in Lancashire, England

People 
Doreen Lostock, a fictional character in the British soap opera Coronation Street

See also